Tamil Nadu Energy Development Agency (TEDA) is a state government owned agency in the Indian state of Tamil Nadu. Established in 1984, the agency takes the onus of promoting and proliferating the New and Renewable energy sources in this state. This government undertaking is also the Nodal agency for Renewable energy related interests in this state.

Overview
TEDA was established as a society under the Societies Registration Act in 1984 with the objective of promoting renewable energy in all its aspects like Identification, Trapping, Research and Development and conservation. The Government of Tamil Nadu is giving emphasis on the development of renewable energy through this agency by implementation of various schemes like providing technical expertise, financial assistance to individuals, non-profit organisations etc. who wish to participate in this greener initiative. It is very necessary to get registered in order to be a system integrator in Tamil Nadu.

References

State agencies of Tamil Nadu
Government agencies established in 1984
Renewable energy in India
State electricity agencies of India
Energy in Tamil Nadu
1984 establishments in Tamil Nadu